B. Kuppenheimer & Co., or simply Kuppenheimer, was a men's clothing manufacturing and retail operation based in Chicago, Illinois and later Atlanta, Georgia.

History

Kohn, Clayburgh & Einstein
In 1852, Bernard Kuppenheimer, who immigrated to America in 1850, founded a retail clothing store in Terre Haute, Indiana.  In 1863, Julius Kohn, Martin Clayburgh, and Morris Einstein founded Kohn, Clayburgh & Einstein at 27 Lake Street in Chicago.  Only two years later, in 1865, Kohn retired and Bernard Kuppenheimer, who relocated to Chicago leaving the Terre Haute store under the supervision of his brother John, and David Lindauer became members. Clayburgh, Einstein, Kuppenheimer, and Lindauer continued to operate the company without changing the name. They operated out of the Lake Street location until the Great Chicago Fire of 1871, when their building was burnt to the ground and they suffered losses totaling $200,000. After rebuilding, they resumed business and in July 1872, moved to the corner of Randolph Street and Wabash Avenue where they remained until the fall of 1876.

B. Kuppenheimer & Co.
In 1876, the business was dissolved and Kuppenheimer formed B. Kuppenheimer & Co. The new company was composed of him, his son Jonas Kuppenheimer, and Samuel Nathan. The remaining members of the Kohn, Claybugh & Einstein reorganized as Einstein, Longini & Co. B. Kuppenheimer & Co. started in business on Wabash Avenue and stayed there until 1880.

In January 1880, Kuppenheimer & Co. moved to Madison Street and Louis B. Kuppenheimer, the second son of Bernard Kuppenheimer, was admitted as a partner. As of 1884, Kuppenheimer & Co had annual sales of nearly $1,000,000. In 1903, Kuppenheimer died and was buried at Rosehill Cemetery and Mausoleum in Chicago.

In 1906, the company operated "The House of Kuppenheimer" branches in Boston and New York, with sales in Washington, D.C. handled by Isidor Grosner of 1013 Pennsylvania Ave., NW. During the World War I, Kuppenheimer manufactured the uniforms for the U.S. Army. By 1910, the company employed close to 2,000 men and women at shops in and around Chicago.

In 1912, Louis became vice-president of the company.  In 1920, Albert Kuppenheimer retired from the company. He died in California in 1931 at the age of 64 although his residence in Chicago was the Drake Hotel. Later in 1920, Louis Kuppenheimer became president of B. Kuppenheimer & Co.

In 1921, Jonas Kuppenheimer, who had been serving as president of "The House of Kuppenheimer," died.  In 1926, Louis Kuppenheimer retired as president of the company. In 1936, Louis, the last living son of founder Bernard Kuppenheimer, died.

In 1959, Lester E. Frankenstein succeeded Bertram J. Cahn to become president of the company. Frankenstein was previously the vice-president.

Sale and closure
In March 1963, the firm was purchased by Louis Roth & Co., Inc. of Los Angeles for $3 million.  The firm continued as a leading manufacturer of men's clothing until 1982, when it was purchased by Hart Schaffner & Marx (later known as Hartmarx), a Chicago-based apparel-maker and wholesaler. By the mid-1990s, after the headquarters moved to Atlanta, sales were lagging, many of its stores were closing, and it entered into bankruptcy.

In 1995, Hartmarx sold Kuppenheimer to Kupp Acquisition Corp. for $14 million in cash ($12 million upfront and an additional $2 million over the next four years) and a $2.5 million promissory note secured by one of Kuppenheimer's manufacturing facilities. Kupp was formed by an investment group led by Gene Kosack, former president and chief executive of NBO Stores Inc., a clothing retailer.

In 1997, The Men's Wearhouse purchased Kuppenheimer Manufacturing Co. from Kupp Acquisition Corp. At that time, Kuppenheimer consisted of 43 men's clothing stores, mostly in the Chicago, St. Louis and Atlanta areas and the manufacturing facilities. The sale included the rights to Kuppenheimer's trademark and customer list. Men's Wearhouse closed the remaining Kuppenheimer stores and folded the business into its own by liquidating the remaining assets.

In popular culture
In the 1960s, Kuppenheimer was the supplier of Rod Serling's wardrobe on his television series, The Twilight Zone.
Kuppenheimer is known for commissioning American illustrator J.C. Leyendecker to create hundreds of paintings to be used in their advertisements.
In the Netflix show Jupiter's Legacy that premiered in 2021 in Season 1 Episode 2, Sheldon Sampson brings a Kuppenheimer suit to dress his father at the father's funeral.

Gallery

Further reading

B. Kuppenheimer & Co. Spring Book Of B. Kuppenheimer & Co. : Illustrating A New Century Of Clothing-Radically Different From The Old-And Incidentally Decpicting The More Striking Changes In Men's Wear During The Past One Hundred Years. (1905) 
Kuppenheimer and Company, Styles for Men: A Book Issued to Show Authoritatively What is Fashionable and Correct for Fall and Winter 1907-'08 (1907)
The House Of Kuppenheimer, Facts Versus Fables About The Present Cost Of Good Clothing (1920)

References

Defunct retail companies of the United States
Clothing retailers of the United States
Defunct companies based in Chicago
Companies based in Atlanta
Retail companies established in 1876
1876 establishments in Illinois
Manufacturing companies established in 1876
Retail companies disestablished in 1997